Carneiro is an unincorporated community in Ellsworth County, Kansas, United States.

History
Carneiro was a station and shipping point on the Union Pacific Railroad.

The first post office in Carneiro was established as Alum Creek in 1872. The post office was renamed Carneiro in 1882, and remained in operation until it was discontinued in 1953. The obituary of Ernest Oakley Cunningham states that he served as Post Master in Carneiro, then later, Post Master in Langley, Kansas. Mr. Cunningham came to Ellsworth county in 1870, at the age of 15. At the time of his death, he was the oldest of the pioneers then living in Ellsworth County.

Education
The community is served by Ellsworth USD 327 public school district.

References

Further reading

External links
 Ellsworth County maps: Current, Historic, KDOT

Unincorporated communities in Ellsworth County, Kansas
Unincorporated communities in Kansas